Hyner Run is a tributary of the West Branch Susquehanna River in Clinton and Lycoming Counties in Pennsylvania in the United States.

See also
List of rivers of Pennsylvania
Tangascootack Creek

References

Rivers of Pennsylvania
Tributaries of the West Branch Susquehanna River
Rivers of Clinton County, Pennsylvania
Rivers of Lycoming County, Pennsylvania